Maria Isabel of Braganza (Maria Isabel Francisca de Assis Antónia Carlota Joana Josefa Xavier de Paula Micaela Rafaela Isabel Gonzaga; 19 May 1797 – 26 December 1818) was an Infanta of Portugal who became Queen of Spain as the second wife of Ferdinand VII of Spain.

Early years
Maria Isabel, born Maria Isabel Francisca de Assis Antónia Carlota Joana Josefa Xavier de Paula Micaela Rafaela Isabel Gonzaga, was born to John VI of Portugal and Carlota Joaquina of Spain on 19 May 1797. She was born as their third child and second daughter. The marriage between her father and mother was unhappy, Carlota Joaquina attempting to have King John VI deemed insane. 

In 1807 Napoleon invaded Portugal, and the royal family unwillingly fled to Brazil. Maria Isabel’s mother Carlota sent her eldest surviving son, Pedro, to join his father and grandmother onboard the ship Principe Real whilst Carlota and the rest of her children would board the Affonso d’Albuquerque.

Upon their arrival, Carlota and her children were forced to shave their heads and wear white muslin hats.

Upbringing
Maria Isabel and her siblings were carefully educated by her mother liberally. Maria Isabel was noted to be kind, balanced and shy, and was much like her father within her personality.

Marriage 

On 20 March 1816, Queen Maria I of Portugal perished. Due to this, Maria Isabel’s father John became the King of Portugal and Brazil. On 22 February 1816 marriage contracts between Ferdinand VII of Spain and Maria Isabel were officially signed; they would soon marry 29 September 1816. Ferdinand was 32 years old and Maria Isabel was 19.

Towards the end 1816 Maria Isabel and Ferdinand were married, and then settled in Madrid. There, Maria Isabel was then quickly pregnant. Maria Isabel gave birth to a daughter, who they named María Luisa Isabel, on 21 August 1817. María Luisa Isabel died four-five months later.

Death 
Maria Isabel was pregnant soon after the birth of María Luisa Isabel, but the birth was indeed a difficult one: the baby was in breech and the physicians soon found that the child had died. Maria Isabel stopped breathing soon thereafter and the doctors thought she was dead. 

Maria Isabel’s sister protested against the doctors' thoughts on presuming her dead. The king, however, ordered a fatal caesarean. When they started cutting her stomach to extract the dead fetus, she suddenly shouted in pain and collapsed on her bed, bleeding heavily. She died soon afterwards on 26 December 1818 in the Palace of Aranjuez, and was buried at the Escorial — the royal site of San Lorenzo de El Escorial.

Legacy
Queen Maria Isabel's dedication and affection for art led her to gather many treasures from the past and create a royal museum, which would end up being the beginnings of Museo del Prado. It opened on 19 November 1819, a year after the queen's death.

Issue

Ancestors

Honours and arms

Dame of the Order of Queen Maria Luisa
Dame of the Order of Saint Isabel

See also 
Napoleonic Wars

References

|-

External links 

 Maria Isabel of Braganza — The British Museum
 Queen María Isabel of Braganza as founder of the Museo del Prado — Museo Nacional Del Prado

Spanish royal consorts
Portuguese infantas
House of Braganza
House of Bourbon (Spain)
1797 births
Deaths in childbirth
1818 deaths
Dames of the Order of Saint Isabel
Burials in the Pantheon of Infantes at El Escorial
People from Lisbon
18th-century Portuguese people
19th-century Portuguese people
18th-century Portuguese women
19th-century Portuguese women
Daughters of kings